Ramdhari Singh (23 September 1908 – 24 April 1974), known by his pen name Dinkar, was an Indian Hindi and Maithili language poet, essayist, freedom fighter, patriot and academic. He emerged as a poet of rebellion as a consequence of his nationalist poetry written in the days before Indian independence. His poetry exuded Veer Rasa (heroic sentiment), and he has been hailed as a Rashtrakavi ('national poet') and Yuga-Chāraṇa (Charan of the Era) on account of his inspiring patriotic compositions. He was a regular poet of Hindi Kavi Sammelan and is hailed to be as popular and connected to poetry lovers for Hindi speakers as Pushkin for Russians.

One of the notable modern Hindi poets, Dinkar was born in a poor family in Simaria village of Bengal Presidency, British India, now part of Begusarai district in Bihar state. The government had honored him with the Padma Bhushan Award in the year 1959 and had also nominated him thrice to the Rajya Sabha . Similarly, his political thought was greatly shaped by both Mahatma Gandhi and Karl Marx. Dinkar gained popularity in the pre-independence period through his nationalist poetry.

Dinkar initially supported the revolutionary movement during the Indian independence struggle, but later became a Gandhian. However, he used to call himself a "Bad Gandhian" because he supported the feelings of indignation and revenge among the youth. In , he accepted that war is destructive but argued that it is necessary for the protection of freedom. He was close to prominent nationalists of the time such as Rajendra Prasad, Anugrah Narayan Sinha, Sri Krishna Sinha, Rambriksh Benipuri and Braj Kishore Prasad.

Dinkar was elected three times to the Rajya Sabha, and he was the member of this house from 3 April 1952 to 26 January 1964, and was awarded the Padma Bhushan in 1959. He was also the Vice-Chancellor of Bhagalpur University (Bhagalpur, Bihar) in the early 1960s.

During The Emergency, Jayaprakash Narayan had attracted a gathering of one lakh people at the Ramlila grounds and recited Dinkar's famous poem:  ('Vacate the throne, for the people are coming').

Biography
Dinkar was born on 23 September 1908, in Simaria village, Bengal Presidency, British India, (now in Begusarai district in Bihar) in a Bhumihar family to Babu Ravi Singh and Manroop Devi. He was married in Tabhka village of Samastipur district in Bihar. As a student, his favourite subjects were history, politics and philosophy. At school and later in college, he studied Hindi, Sanskrit, Maithili, Bengali, Urdu and English literature. Dinkar was greatly influenced by Rabindranath Tagore, Keats and Milton and translated works of Rabindranath Tagore from Bengali to Hindi. The poetic persona of the poet Dinkar was shaped by the pressures and counter-pressures of life during the Indian freedom movement. A tall man,  in height, with a shining white complexion, long high nose, large ears and broad forehead, he tended to have a noticeable appearance.

As a student, Dinkar had to battle day to day issues, some related to their family's economic circumstances. When he was a student of Mokama High School, it was not possible for him to stay on until school closed at four p.m. as he had to leave the class after the lunch break to catch the steamer back home. He could not afford to be in the hostel which would have enabled him to attend all periods. How could a student who had no shoes on his feet manage the hostel fees? His poetry later showed the impact of poverty. This was the environment in which Dinkar grew up and became a nationalist poet of radical views. In 1920, Dinkar saw Mahatma Gandhi for the first time. About this time, he founded Manoranjan Library at Simariya. He also edited a handwritten pamphlet.

Creative struggle 
When Dinkar stepped into his adolescence, the Indian freedom movement had already begun under the leadership of Mahatma Gandhi. In 1929, when after matriculation, he entered Patna College to study intermediate; this movement started becoming aggressive. In 1928, the Simon Commission, against which nationwide demonstrations were being held, arrived. Demonstrations were held in Patna too led by Maghfoor Ahmad Ajazi and Dinkar too signed the oath-paper. Thousands came to the rally at Gandhi Maidan in which Dinkar also participated. During the protest against Simon Commission, the police of the British government mercilessly lathi charged the Lion of Punjab, Lala Lajpat Rai, who succumbed to the injuries. The whole country was in turmoil. The youthful mind of Dinkar became increasingly radical due to these agitations. His emotional nature was charged with poetic energy.

Dinkar's first poem was published in 1924 in a paper called  ('Brother of Students').  was a local newspaper established under the editorship of Narsingh Das. In 1928, the peasant's satyagraha under the leadership of Sardar Vallabhbhai Patel proved successful in Bardoli of Gujarat. He wrote ten poems based on this Satyagraha which was published in a book form under the title  ('Message of Victory'). This composition is now available. Right in front of Patna College, the office of Yuvak functioned. To escape the wrath of the government, Dinkar's poems were published under the pseudonym "Amitabh". On 14 September 1928, a poem of his, on the martyrdom of Jatin Das, was published. In 1930, he composed a poem called  ('The Breach of Vow'), which was mentioned by Ramchandra Shukla in his history.

Dinkar's first collection of poems, was published in November 1935. Around this time, Chaturvediji went to Sevagram. The copy was given to Mahatma Gandhi.

The famous historian Dr. Kashi Prasad Jaiswal is said to have loved him like a son. During the early days of Dinkar's poetic career, Jaiswal helped him in every way. Jaiswal died on 4 August 1937, which was a great blow to the young poet. Now when I have savoured the love and encouragement of the Sun, Moon, Varun, Kuber, Indra, Brihaspati, Shachi and Brahmani, it is clear that none of them was like Jaiswalji. As I heard the news of his death, the world became a dark place for me. I did not know what to do." Jaiswalji was the first person to appreciate the historical sense in the poetry of Dinkar.

Work
Some of his greatest works are Rashmirathi and Parashuram ki Prateeksha. He is hailed as the greatest Hindi poet of 'Veer Rasa' since Bhushan.

Acharya (teacher) Hazari Prasad Dwivedi wrote that Dinkar was very popular among people whose mother-tongue was not Hindi and he was a symbol of love for one's own mother-tongue. Harivansh Rai Bachchan wrote that for his proper respect, Dinkar should get four Bharatiya Jnanpith Awards – for poetry, prose, languages and for his service to Hindi. Rambriksh Benipuri wrote that Dinkar is giving voice to the revolutionary movement in the country. Namvar Singh wrote that he was really the sun of his age.

Hindi writer Rajendra Yadav, whose novel  also carried a few lines of Dinkar's poetry, has said of him, "He was always very inspiring to read. His poetry was about reawakening. He often delved into Hindu mythology and referred to heroes of epics such as Karna." He was a poet of anti-imperialism and nationalism, says well-known Hindi writer Kashinath Singh.

He also wrote social and political satires aimed at socio-economic inequalities and exploitation of the underprivileged.

A progressive and humanist poet, he chose to approach history and reality directly and his verse combined oratorical vigour with a declamatory diction. The theme of  revolves round love, passion, and the relationship of man and woman on a spiritual plane, distinct from their earthly relationship.

It was written at a time when the memories of the Second World War were fresh in the mind of the poet.

His  is a collection of poems reflecting the poet's social concern transcending the boundaries of the nation.

His  is considered among the best retellings of the life of Karna of the Hindu epic .

Krishna Ki Chetavani 
Krishna ki Chetavani is the most celebrated and cited poem from one of his famous books 'Rashmirathi'

following is the poem with English translation

Varsho tak van mein ghoom ghoom

Badha vighno ko chum chum

Sah dhoop, ghav, paani, patthar

Pandav aaye kuch aur nikhar

(After wandering in the forest for years

tolerating various hardships

the  Pandavas have come back with a new vigour)

Saubhagya na sab din sota hai

Dekhe aage kya hota hai

(Good luck doesn't always last

Let us see what happens next)

Maitri ki rah dikhane ko

Sabko su-marg par laane ko

Duryodhan ko samjhane ko

Bhishan vidhwans bachane ko

Bhagwan Hastinapur aaye

Pandav ka sandesa laaye

(To show the path of friendship

to bring everyone on the path of righteousness

in order to convince Duryodhan

and to prevent massive destruction

The Lord came to Hastinapur

with a message from the Pandavas)

Ho nyay agar toh aadha do

Par ismein bhi yedhi badha ho

Toh de do kewal paanch graam

Rakho apni dharti tamaam

(If you are just, then give them half of the Kingdom

but if you have a problem with even that

then give them five villages at least

and keep the rest to yourselves)

Hum wahi khushi se khayenge

Parijan par asi na uthayenge

(We will be happy even with that much

and we will never take up arms against our relatives)

Duryodhan Waha bhi de na saka

Aashish samaj ki na le saka

Ulte Hari ko bandhne chala

Jo tha asadhya saadhne chala

(Duryodhan couldn't even give them that

and hence he couldn't even receive the blessings of society

Instead, he tried to chain Krishna

and in doing so tried to attempt the impossible)

Jab naash manuj par Chaata hai

Pehle vivek marr jata hai

(When the end draws near

the first thing a man loses is his wisdom)

Hari ne bhishan hunkar kiya

Apna swaroop vistaar kiya

Dag-mag dag-mag diggaj dole

Bhagwan kupit hokar bole

(Hari roared

and expanded his form

the mighty trembled

as the Lord, angered, spoke)

Zanjeer badha ab saadh muze

Ha ha Duryodhan bandh muze

(Bring out your chains

and yes Duryodhan, try to imprison me)

Ye dekh gagan mujhmein lay hai

Ye dekha pawan mujhmein lay hai

Mujhmein vileen jhankar sakal

Mujhmein lay hai sansaar sakal

(Look, the skies are within me

look, the wind is within me

Look closely, the entire universe is within me)

Amaratwa phoolta hai mujhmein

Sanhaar jhoolta hai mujhmein

(Immortality & destruction both are within me)

Udayachal mere dipt bhaal

Bhumandal vaksha sthal vishaal

Bhuj paridhi bandh ko ghere hai

Mainak meru pag mere hai

(The dawn is my forehead

the solar system my chest

my arms have surrounded the Earth

the Mainak & Meru are at my feet)

Deepte jo grah nakshatra nikhar

Sab hai mere mukh ke andar

(And my mouth holds all the luminous planets & constellations)

Drugg ho toh drushya akhand dekh

Mujhmein saara brahmand dekh

Charachar jeev jag kshar - akshar

Nashwar manshya srujaati amar

(If you are capable then see the whole universe in me

the living, the non living, the eternal)

Shat-koti surya, shat-koti chandra

Shat-koti saritsar, shati-koti sindhu mandra

(Millions of suns, millions of moons

millions of rivers & oceans)

Shat-koti Bramha, Vishnu, Mahesh

Shat-koti Jalpati, Jishnu, Dhanesh

Shant-koti Rudra, Shat-koti Kaal

Shat-koti danddhar lokpal

(Millions of Brahma, Vishnu, Mahesh

millions of seas & Jishnu & Dhanesh

Millions of Rudra & millions of Kaal

Millions of Kings)

Bhutal atal paatal dekh

Gat aur anagat kaal dekh

Ye dekh jagat ka aadi srujan

Ye dekh Mahabharata ka rann

(See the Earth & see the hell

see the times past & future

see the beginning of creation

see the war of Mahabharata)

Mrutako se pati huyi bhu hai

Pehchaan kaha ismein tu hai

(The land is covered with the dead,

now find where are you among them)

Ambar ka kuntal jaal dekh

Pad ke neeche paatal dekh

Mutthi mein teeno kaal dekh

Mera swaroop vikraal dekh

(See the heavens

and see the Paatal beneath my feet,

see in my fists the past, present & future

see my terrifying appearance)

Sab janma mujhise paate hai

Fir laut mujhimein aate hai

(Everyone is born of me

And everyone eventually returns to me)

Jivha se kaadhti jwala saghan

Saaso se pata janma pawan

Par jaati meri drishti jidhar

Hasne lagti hai srishti udhar

(Look at my tongue emitting fire

my breath gives birth to the winds

where my eyes see

nature blooms there)

Main jab bhi mundta hoon lochan

Cha jaata charo or maran

(but when I close my eyes

death reigns)

Bandhne mujhe tu aaya hai

Zanjeer badi kya laya hai?

Yadi mujhe bandhna chahe mann

Pehle tu bandh anant gagan

(You have come to arrest me

Have you got a chain big enough?

because imprisoning me

is like trying to chain that limitless sky)

Shunya ko saadh na sakta hai

Wo muze bandh kab sakta hai

(When you cannot measure infinity

how can you imprison me?)

Hit vachan nahi tune maana

Maitri ka mulya na pehchana

Toh le ab main  bhi jata hoon

Antim sankalp sunata hoon

(You did not heed good advice

and did not value our friendship

so I will leave now

making this vow)

Yachana nahi ab rann hoga

Jeevan jay ya ki maran hoga

(There will be no more requests, there will a be war now,

victory will be the fate of life or death)

Takrayenge nakshatra nikhar

Barsegi bhu par vanhi prakhar

Fan sheshnaag ka dolega

Vikraal kaal muh kholega

(Constellations will clash

Fire will rain down on the earth

the Sheshnaag will bare its hood

and death will open its jaws)

Duryodhan rann aisa hoga

Fir kabhi nahi jaisa hoga

(Duryodhan a war like never before will take place)

Bhai par bhai tootenge

Vish-ban boond se chutenge

Saubhagya manuj ke phutenge

Vaayas shrugaal sukh lutenge

(Brothers will fight brothers

as arrows rain down

the good men will suffer

while the jackals & hyenas will feast)

Aakhir tu bhushaayi hoga

Hinsa ka pardaayi hoga

(In the end you will be destroyed

and will be the cause of all violence)

Thi sabha sunn, sab log dare

Chup the ya the behosh pade

Keval do nar na aghate the

Dhritarashtra Vidur sukh paate the

(A deadly silence had descended on the court, everyone there was scared

some had fallen silent while some had fainted

Except for two who remained unaffected

Dhritarashtra & Vidur were the fortunate ones)

Kar jod khade pramudit nirbhay

Dono pukarte the jay, jay

(With hands joined, fearless & with love in their hearts

the kept chanting 'jai jai')

In his , he said that despite various cultures, languages and topography, India stands united, because "however different we may be, our thoughts are one and the same". Dinkar made the understanding of historical perspectives much more direct by looking at the history of India's culture in terms of four major encounters: the autochthons (indigenous people) ; between Vedic beliefs and the philosophy propounded by the Buddha, as well as by Mahavira; between Hinduism and Islam; and finally between European civilisation and the Indian way of life and learning. These encounters at different periods of history have imparted strength to India's culture. The most striking feature of India's civilizational history has been its marked tolerance and human approach with its potential to impart a message to the world.

History is not merely a compilation of facts. History is written from an ideological perspective. The poet Dinkar wrote  in the context of values emerging from the freedom movement. The nationalist view of history, which was propounded in the field of history, is propounded by Dinkar in the field of culture. The values which developed in the context of the freedom movement determine the perspective of this book. Those values are anti-colonialism, secularism and the idea of integrated culture. This book has been written around these very values. Dinkar is the nationalist historian of Indian culture.

Divided into four vast chapters, in the first chapter, the form and development of the culture of India from pre-Vedic times to around the middle of the 20th century has been discussed. In the second chapter the Buddhist and Jain religions which grew as a revolt against ancient Hinduism have been analysed. In the third chapter, the influence of Islam on Hindu culture after its advent along with the influence of Islam on Hindu-Muslim relations, like – nature, language, art and culture has been studied. In this chapter a very authentic investigation into the mutual relation between the Bhakti movement and Islam has been presented. In this context, it has also been considered how the culture of India acquires an integrated form. In the fourth chapter, a comprehensive account of the colonialisation of education and the clash of Christianity with Hinduism, etc., since the arrival of Europeans in India has also been given. In this chapter, along with an inquiry into the Renaissance of the 19th century, the contributions of the leading leaders of the Renaissance have been comprehensively discussed. A leading characteristic of this chapter is also that a copious account of the Hindu Renaissance and with it of the Muslim Renaissance and its limitations have been presented.

Dinkar :

 The vast panoramic overview of Dinkar's historiography of India's composite culture verges on a kind of Darwinist evolutionism. The idea of India of Dinkar's imagination is reminiscent of the American 'melting pot' model of assimilative nationalism.

Awards and honors
He received awards from Kashi Nagri Pracharini Sabha, Uttar Pradesh Government and also an award by the Government of India for his epic poem . He received the Sahitya Akademi Award in 1959 for his work . He was also a recipient of Padma Bhushan in 1959 by the Government of India. He was awarded the LLD degree by Bhagalpur University. He also became a nominated member of the Rajya Sabha, in 1952.

Death 
Dinkar was in Tirupati ,Andhra Pradesh for his poetry meeting .He did his last poetry reading at Tirupati Temple on third Canto of his famous Book Rashmirathi on great form of Lord Krishna. After his famous poetry, at night on 24 April 1974 ,Dinkar got cardiac arrest and died.

Posthumous recognitions
 
On 30 September 1987, to mark his 79th birth anniversary, tributes were paid to him by the then President of India, Shankar Dayal Sharma.

In 1999, Dinkar was one of the Hindi writers featured on a set of commemorative postal stamps released by Government of India to celebrate the linguistic harmony of India, marking the 50th anniversary since India adopted Hindi as its official language.

The government released a book on Dinkar's birth centenary authored by Khagendra Thakur.

At the same time a statue of him was unveiled in Patna at the Dinkar Chowk, and a two-day national seminar was organised in Calicut University.

The Chief Minister of Bihar, Nitish Kumar, inaugurated  an engineering college Rastrakavi Ramdhari Singh Dinkar College of Engineering  in the district of Begusarai named after the legendary Hindi poet Ramdhari Singh Dinkar.

Major poetic works

His other works are:

  (1929)
  (1935)
 Hunkar (epic poem) (1938)
  (1939)
  (1940)
  (1946)
  (1946)
  (1947)
  (1947)
  (1951)
  (1951)
  (1951)
 Rashmirathi (1952)
  (1954)
  (1954)
  (1955)
  (1954)
  (1954)
  (1956)
  (1957)
  (1957)
  (1957)
 
  (1961)
  (1963)
  (1964)
  (1964)
  (1964)
  (1970)
  (1970)

Anthologies

  (1960)
  (1964)
  (1973)
  (1973)
  (1974)
  (1974)
 , Lokbharti Prakashan, New Delhi, 2008.
 , Lokbharti Prakashan, New Delhi, 2008.
 , Lokbharti Prakashan, New Delhi, 2008.
 , Lokbharti Prakashan, New Delhi, 2008.
 , Lokbharti Prakashan, New Delhi, 2008.

Major prose works
Dinkar's major analytical and other prose works are:

 (1946)
 (1948)
 (1952)
 (1954)
 (1954)
 (1955)
 (1955)
 (1956)
 (1956)
 (1958)
 (1958)
 (1958)
 (1959)
 (1961)
 (1965)
 (1966)
 (1968)
 (1968)
 (1970)
 (1971)
 (1971)
 (1973)
 (1973)
 (1973)
 (1973)

Literary criticism

 , Lokbharti Prakashan, New Delhi, 2008.
 , Lokbharti Prakashan, New Delhi, 2008.
 , Lokbharti Prakashan, New Delhi, 2008.
 , Lokbharti Prakashan, New Delhi, 2008.
 , Lokbharti Prakashan, New Delhi, 2008.

Biographies

 Sri Aurobindo: , Lokbharti Prakashan, New Delhi, 2008.
 , Lokbharti Prakashan, New Delhi, 2008.
 , Lokbharti Prakashan, New Delhi, 2008.
 , Dr Diwakar, 2008.

Translations

  translated by Ramdhari Singh Dinkar. In , edited by Asit Kumar Bandopadhyaya, Sahitya Akademi, Delhi.
  (101 selected poems of Tagore) translated by Ramdhari Singh Dinkar along with Hazari Prasad Dwivedi, Hans Kumar Tiwari, and Bhawani Prasad Mishra, Sahitya Akademi, 2001 (reprint).

Translations into Hindi and other languages

 Dinkar's Urvashi: a saga of human love and Vedanta. Trans. by Krishna Kumar Vidyarthi.  (New Delhi: Siddharth Publications, 1994. 165 p.)
 Reflections on men and things (essays). (Ajmer: Krishna Brothers, 1968. 80 p.)
 Kurukshetra. Trans. by R.K. Kapur.  London: n.p., 1967.
 [Rasmirathi] Sun charioteer. Trans. by R.D. Dunda, D. Nelson and P. Staneslow. (Minnesota: Nagari Press, 1981.)
 Voices of the Himalaya: poems. Trans. by the author, Kamala Ratnam, V.K. Gokak and others. (Bombay: Asia Publishing House, 1966. vi, 70 p.)
 Himalayas Xotros Poems (Spanish), Collection of thirty poems, Publisher – University of Conceyeion, Chile.
 Sining Potos [Blue Lotus] (Russian), Collection of sixty poems, Progress Publishers, Moscow, Russia.
 Kurukshetra: an aftermath of war, a new search for peace from the classical thought : light radiates through dialogue; translated by Winand M. Callewaert, P. Adeswara Rao; Heritage Publication Division, 1995.
 Ramdhari Singh Dinkar, Reflections on men and things, Krishna Bros., 1968.

See also
 List of Indian writers
 List of Indian poets

References

External links

 Ramdhari Singh Dinkar at Kavita Kosh
 Dinkar at Anubhuti
 Dinkar's works in Pdf Format

1908 births
1974 deaths
Epic poets
Hindi-language poets
Indian male poets
Indian male essayists
Indian male journalists
Indian literary critics
Heads of universities and colleges in India
Hindi-language writers
Recipients of the Padma Bhushan in literature & education
Recipients of the Sahitya Akademi Award in Hindi
Recipients of the Jnanpith Award
Rajya Sabha members from Bihar
Writers of Mithila
People from Begusarai district
Poets from Bihar
Indian satirists
Rashtrakavi
20th-century Indian poets
20th-century Indian essayists
Journalists from Bihar
Translators from Bengali
20th-century Indian translators
Academic staff of Tilka Manjhi Bhagalpur University